UL16 binding protein 2 (ULBP2) is a cell surface glycoprotein encoded by ULBP2 gene located on the chromosome 6. ULBP2 is related to MHC class I molecules, but its gene maps outside the MHC locus. The domain structure of ULBP2 differs significantly from those of conventional MHC class I molecules. It does not contain the α3 domain and the transmembrane segment. ULBP2 is thus composed of only the α1α2 domain which is linked to the cell membrane by the GPI anchor. 

ULBP2 functions as a stress-induced  ligand for the NKG2D killer activation receptor on natural killer cells.

References

Further reading